Warsash is a village in southern Hampshire, England, situated at the mouth of the River Hamble, west of the area known as Locks Heath. Boating plays an important part in the village's economy, and the village has a sailing club. It is also home to the Warsash Maritime Academy, part of Southampton Solent University, which provides training for Merchant Navy Officers from around the world.

The Locks Heath, Warsash and Whiteley urban area had a combined population of 43,359 according to 2011 Census. This also includes Park Gate and Swanwick and forms a subdivision of the South Hampshire built up area.

Warsash is in the borough of Fareham, and is part of the Fareham parliamentary constituency. The village lies in the Hook-with-Warsash parish, with the hamlet of Hook.

History
Before the 19th century what is now known as Warsash was a number of separate hamlets; Warsash itself; Hook to the south at the mouth of the River Hamble; Newtown between Hook and Warsash and Chilling on Southampton Water. Hook was of earlier importance, as a 'dockyard' during the Hundred Years' War. At the end of this war Hook's importance declined, and for the next 300 years it, Chilling and Warsash continued as hamlets making livings from fishing and smuggling. Newtown had in addition a number of salterns.

Towards the end of the 18th century the land around Hook had been acquired by the Hornby family to form the Hook Estate   This new estate was bordered to the north by the existing Warsash House estate.

In 1807 the shipbuilder George Parsons, who had lost the lease of his former shipyard up-river at Bursledon, began construction of a shipyard at Warsash at a site where the present Shore Road was later built; all the buildings at the former Bursledon site, including a graving shed and a mould-loft, were dismantled and re-erected at Warsash   In partnership with his son John Parsons and grandson John Rubie, Parsons then built a number of vessels during the following four years, including four ships for the Royal Navy - the 18-gun brig-sloop HMS Peruvian in 1808,  the 36-gun frigates HMS Theban and HMS Hotspur in 1809 and 1810 , and the 38-gun frigate HMS Nymphe in 1812. Following George's death in 1812, his son and grandson built a further ship for the Navy - the 36-gun frigate HMS Laurel.

In the 19th century Warsash started to expand in size and importance when shipbuilding moved across the river from Hamble-le-Rice. Along the coast Newtown was also expanding, the salterns had expanded into a chemical works and an iron smelting industry had started. By the mid-19th century the two communities had been linked by road, with housing along these roads filling the open space to create one community.

By the end of 19th century the lack of threat from the French had sent the shipbuilding industry into decline. The iron and chemical works were also declining. The main sources of income for the area were the burgeoning strawberry growing industry and traditional fishing and agriculture. Alongside these industries grew businesses providing refreshments and services to visitors to the area, especially those of the new leisure sailing pursuits. At the crossroads in the centre of the village there is an unusual clock tower built around 1900, an example of the prosperity the leisure industry brought.

Warsash Clock Tower
Warsash House Estate built a tower faced by a clock in the centre of the village to hold up to 6,000 gallons of water. In present days the water tower has been removed and the clock tower is a private residence.

Warsash Pubs

Warsash has 4 pubs within  of each other: The Rising Sun on the shorefront, The Hook (as of December 2021, previously known as The Ship and Shovel, The Ferryman and before that a popular jazz pub known as The Great Harry), The Jolly Farmer in Fleet End Road and The Silver Fern.

St Mary's
The parish church, St Mary's, dates from 1871. The old vicarage site on Osborne Road has been redeveloped and new houses erected. In 2000, local sculptor Ian G Brennan was commissioned to produce a bas-relief carving to be fitted above the entrance to the vestry. The finished piece is made of lime-wood and shows various landmarks of the village and a large dove of peace. The approach to the church (Church Road) was previously an undeveloped laurel avenue. Many of the hedges have been replaced by fences or walls but several are still flourishing. At the end of the road the mounting block still survives, at the site of the old avenue gates.

D-Day
On 5 June 1944 British and allied commando units sailed from Warsash for the Normandy Landings. Some of the units were trained at HMS Tormentor.

Hamble-Warsash Ferry

Warsash is the eastern landing-place for the ferry crossing the River Hamble from Hamble-le-Rice. The ferry was once an important link in a historic route between Portsmouth and Southampton. The ferry now provides a link in local, national and international footpaths such as the Solent Way and cycle routes such as National Cycle Route 2.

The ferry, a foot-passenger only service, is notable for its boats, each painted bright pink. The pink paint scheme is echoed on the shelter by the landing on the east bank of the river.

Throughout the sixties and seventies the ferry was run by a Ray Sedgwick, a local boatman who hired boats out to tourists etc. The ferry hut on the Warsash side was built in the early 1900s by the Bugle pub who sold beer to other local pubs, the hut was used to store kegs as well as keeping travellers out of the rain.

School
Warsash has one primary school, located in Church Road. This school, Hook-with-Warsash Academy, has outstanding Ofsted ratings and is a feeder school to Brookfield Community School.

See also
List of places of worship in the Borough of Fareham

References

External links

Borough of Fareham
Villages in Hampshire
Populated coastal places in Hampshire